The Royal Malaysia Police (often abbreviated RMP), is a (primarily) uniformed national and federal police force in Malaysia. The force is a centralised organisation. Its headquarters are located at Bukit Aman, Kuala Lumpur. The police force is led by an Inspector-General of Police (IGP) who, is Acryl Sani Abdullah Sani.

The constitution, control, employment, recruitment, funding, discipline, duties and powers of the police force are specified and governed by the Police Act 1967. In carrying out its responsibilities, the regular RMP is also assisted by a support group of Extra Police Constables, Police Volunteer Reserves, Auxiliary Police, Police Cadets and a civilian service element.

The RMP constantly co-operates with police forces worldwide, including from those six neighbouring countries Malaysia shares a border with: Indonesian National Police, Philippine National Police, Royal Brunei Police Force, Royal Thai Police, Singapore Police Force and Vietnam People's Public Security.

Police misconduct within the RMP has been highlighted as a problem. Issues of police brutality, police corruption, and enforced disappearances have been linked to inadequate oversight.

History

A police force has been in existence in Malaysia since the days of the Malacca Sultanate. Malacca's canonical law created what was essentially a police force in Malaysia in the fifteenth century, through the institution of the Temenggung and Hulubalang, or royal warriors. During the Sultan of Malacca's absence, the Bendahara, or Prime Minister, held absolute authority, with the power to hand out sentences, but it was the Temenggung who acted as the Police Chief or Inspector General of Police. His tasks were to arrest criminals, build jails and implement sentences. Apart from the Temenggung, there were a number of Penghulu or village chiefs who had the duty of policing their respective villages. Their main tasks included tax collection, law enforcement and preserving village security. These Malacca police systems ended when, on 10 August 1511, a Portuguese fleet led by Afonso de Albuquerque conquered Malacca for the Portuguese crown. Police duties were then largely performed by the Portuguese soldiers.

During the sixteenth century, Malaysia became a cosmopolitan society and the Portuguese government introduced the Kapitan administration. On 14 January 1641, however, the Portuguese lost Malacca to the Dutch Empire, when the Dutch invaded with the help of soldiers from Johor state, at a time when the Portuguese were at war with the Sultanate of Acheh. The Dutch retained the Kapitan system, but when the growing number of Europeans in Malaysia made change necessary, a police force known as the 'Burgher Guard' was established. The Burgher Guard was controlled by the Dutch, but their subordinates were made up of the local citizens. Village leaders continued to assume the duties of policemen under Dutch rule, as they had since before the Portuguese arrived.

Following the assimilation of Malacca into the British Empire in 1795, a modern police organisation in Malaysia was formed, on 25 March 1807, after the Charter of Justice in Penang was granted, with Penang being the first to form a police force. 25 March is today marked as Police Day in Malaysia. Most of the officers were of British origin. Later, this organisation was developed in the Straits Settlements and other Malay states, particularly the Federated Malay States. At that time, independent police forces were established for each respective state. Only after World War II was a central police organisation formed, known as the Civil Affairs Police Force. This organisation was formed in Malaya and led by a British colonial, H.B. Longworthy, who had to stabilise the police forces after the anarchy of Japanese occupation. One of the immediate problems faced by the police at this time was the rebellion of the communist party. During the confrontation between Malaysia and Indonesia, which lasted from 1963 to 1965, the police force, along with military forces, fought against the infiltration of Indonesian forces into the states of Johor and Sabah.

Almost a year after Independence Day, on 24 July 1958, the King of Malaysia, Tuanku Abdul Rahman Ibni Almarhum Tuanku Muhamad, bestowed the title Royal to the Federation of Malaya Police Force. In 1963, the Royal Federation of Malayan Police (RFMP), the North Borneo Armed Constabulary and the Sarawak Constabulary were merged to form the Royal Malaysia Police. The Singapore Police Force became a component unit of the RMP until Singapore's independence in 1965.

Insignia

The flag and insignia of the Royal Malaysia Police has a blue-coloured background which symbolises the Malaysian masses. In the centre of the flag is the PDRM symbol coloured silver or white. The police symbol is made up of an intersected Kris and Ilang / Klewang machete. Above the PDRM symbol, there is a tiger head in a garland of Paddy flowers, with a scroll underneath bearing the name Polis Diraja Malaysia. Arabic lettering in the Crown includes the words Allah on the right and Muhammad on the left.

Moon and star
The Moon and Star symbolises Islam as the official religion of Malaysia.

Crown
The crown, depicted on the Royal Malaysia Police insignia, is a panegyric reference to the King of Malaysia, bestowing the "Royal" title to its name. The words Allah and Muhammad in Arabic, which respectively symbolize Allah the Almighty and Muhammad as the Messenger, signifies Islam as the official religion and faith of RMP personnel are willing to uphold justice and the security of the people of Malaysia.

Kris and the Ilang sword
The Kris is an important symbol of the Malay Peninsula. This particular weapon was used by Malay warriors in the past. According to Frey (2003), who concluded from Sir Stamford Raffles' (1817) study of the Candi Sukuh, the kris came into existence around AD 1361. Others believe that early forms were inspired by the daggers of the Dong-Son in Vietnam (circa 300 BC). In the temples of Borobudur (825 CE) and Prambanan (850CE), renderings of the Kris have been found.

The traditional machete, Ilang or Klewang symbolises the states of Sarawak and Sabah in East Malaysia and it represents the spirit of heroism of a multitude of ethnic tribes such as the Dayak, Dusun, Bajau and Kadazan.

Tiger head
The tiger head symbolises courage, strength and spirits of RMP. Previously, RMP used a lion head as the symbol of courage from 16 September 1963, after the formation of Malaysia, until 15 May 1994, when it was replaced with the tiger head by an official order of Malaysian government. The former lion head also symbolised the states of Singapore (until 1965) and Sabah.

Paddy flower
Paddy flower is a reference to paddy and rice, the staple food for Malaysians and it signifies national prosperity.

Motto
The RMP motto represents team spirit and determination.

Sang Saka Biru
The PDRM flag is called the Blue Perennial or Sang Saka Biru; each colour has its own distinctive meaning and the flag symbolises the force's pride and integrity.

Police pledge
Section 20 (3) Police Act 1967 stipulates that the duties of the Royal Malaysia Police personnel are as follows:

  Apprehending all persons whom he is by law authorised to apprehend;
  Processing security intelligence;
  Conducting prosecutions;
  Giving assistance in the carrying out of any law relating to revenue, excise, sanitation, quarantine, immigration and registration;
  Giving assistance in the preservation of order in the ports, harbours and airports of Malaysia, and in enforcing maritime and port regulations;
  Executing summonses, subpoenas, warrants, commitments and other process lawfully issued by any competent authority;
  Exhibiting information;
  Protecting unclaimed and lost property and finding the owners thereof;
  Seizing stray animals and placing them in a public pound;
  Giving assistance in the protection of life and property;
  Protecting public property from loss or injury;
  Attending the criminal courts and, if specially ordered, the civil courts, and keeping order therein; and
  Escorting and guarding prisoners and other persons in the custody of the police.

Modern day

Inspectors-General of Police

Police rank
Gazetted officers 

Non-gazetted officers 

Lower ranks of police officers apart from Sub-Inspectors wear their rank insignia on the right sleeve of their uniforms. Sub-Inspectors and higher ranks wear their rank insignia on epaulettes on both shoulders.

Prior to 16 February 1996, the police rank were translated from English such as Deputy Commissioner of Police translated as Timbalan Pesuruhjaya Polis. After 16 February 1996, the police rank were translated from Bahasa Malaysia such as Deputy Commissioner of Police translated as Deputi Komisioner Polis, however the abbreviation of police rank would still be in English.

RMP organisational structure 
Apart from the three departments involved in the administration: the Management Department and the Logistics & Technology Department and Integrity and Standards Compliance Department, RMP has seven departments involved in crime prevention: Criminal Investigation Department, Narcotics Criminal Investigation Department, Internal Security and Public Order Department, Special Branch, Crime Prevention and Community Safety Department, Commercial Crime Investigation Department and Traffic Enforcement and Investigation Department. All departments are led by the directors with the rank of Commissioner of Police (Army Equivalent rank of Three Stars General or Lieutenant-General).

Police heads

Staff departments

Management Department

The Management Department is tasked with the routine of management and administration affairs of the RMP. This department is also the "nerve centre" of the RMP and acts as the support services platform for the rest of the force.

Functions
 Service / Designation – Includes: Recruitment, Service Records Administration, Confirmations, Promotions, Transfers, Salaries & Allowances Administration and Retirements.
 General Administration And Policy – Includes: General Administration, Research & Development, Civil Affairs, Welfare, Sports And PERKEP (Persatuan Keluarga Polis or Police's Family Association, generally social activities for the families of the policemen)
 Training – Includes: Basic Course, Development Courses, Further Studies and Rehabilitation Courses.

Branches
 Administration
 Welfare
 Training
 Research & Development
 Services / Designation
 Public Affairs
 Public Relations
 Intake
 Ceremonies
 Camp Commandant
 RMP Sports Council

The Management Department is headed by a Director with the rank of Commissioner of Police (CP) and assisted by four Deputy Directors namely Deputy Director of Management (Training), Deputy Director of Management (Administration), Deputy Director of Management (Services/Staffing) and Deputy Director of Management (Human Resource Policy Division).

Special Branch

This department is responsible for collecting intelligence for national security. Its role is to collect security intelligence related to both domestic and external threats, intercept subversive activities by extremist groups and individuals which could threaten the nation's stability. Also, it is in charge of obtaining, processing, evaluating and disseminating information to other departments and organisations. This department is divided into several branches:

 Technical Intelligence
 Social Intelligence
  External Intelligence
  Political Intelligence
  Economic Intelligence
  Security Intelligence

The Special Branch is headed by a Director with the rank of Commissioner of Police (CP) and assisted by two Deputy Directors, namely Deputy Directors I and II. In accordance with the policing assignment, the main function of the Special Branch is as provided under section 3(3) and section 20(3) of the Police Act 1967.

Criminal Investigation Department (CID)

This department deals with the investigation, arrest and prosecution of both violent crimes such as murder, robbery, rape etc., and less serious crimes such as theft and house-breaking. This department also specialises in investigating gambling, vice and secret societies (triads).

Functions
 Investigations and detective duties
 Arrests and prosecutions
 Enforcement of laws related to gambling, vice and secret societies

Branches
 D1 – Administrative Division
 D2 – Criminal Record Registration Division
 D3 – Anti-Human Trafficking / Migrants Smuggling Prevention Division
 D4 – Operation / Intelligence / Records Divisions
 D5 – Prosecution and Law Divisions
 D6 – Technical Assistance Division
 D7 – Gambling / Vice / Secret Societies Prevention Division
 D8 – Investigation / Planning Division 
 D9 – Special Investigation Division
 D10 – Forensic Laboratory Division
 D11 – Sexual / Domestic Violence / Child Abuse Investigation Division
 D12 – National Centre Bureau-Interpol Division
 D13 – Databank DNA Division
 D14 – Organized Crime Investigation Division

The Criminal Investigation Department is headed by a Director with the rank of Commissioner of Police (CP) and assisted by four Deputy Directors, namely the Deputy Director of Criminal Investigation (Intelligence / Operations), Deputy Director of Criminal Investigation (Investigation / Legal), Deputy Director of Criminal Investigation (Organized Crime), Deputy Director Criminal Investigation (Forensic / Databank / DNA / Strategic Planning). The Unit Tindakan Cepat is attached to CID and based at all police contingent headquarters.

Internal Security and Public Order Department (KDN / KA)

This department is tasked with the maintenance of public security and order. It is responsible for traffic control and search & rescue (SAR) operations. In this role, this department cooperates with other agencies, such as the Malaysian Armed Forces and Army / Navy Maritime Patrol to prevent piracy and to secure the national borders.

The Internal Security and Public Order Department is headed by a Commissioner of Police (CP) and assisted by four deputy directors namely the Deputy Director of JKDNKA (Operations) (Deputy Commissioner), Deputy Director of JKDNKA (PGA) (Deputy Commissioner), Deputy Director of JKDNKA (General Policing) (Senior Assistant Commissioner) and Deputy Director of JKDNKA (PGK) (Senior Assistant Commissioner).

The main branches under this department are:

General Operations Force

The Police Field Force (PFF), organised in battalions, was once the para-military units of the Royal Malaysia Police. The force, which was also known as the Jungle Squad (Pasukan Polis Hutan (PPH) in Malay) was tasked to operate in the jungle fringes in counter-insurgency roles during the Malayan Emergency, Indonesia–Malaysia confrontations and later Communist guerrilla insurgencies along the Malaysian-Thai border and in the jungles of Sabah and Sarawak. When the Malayan Communist Party (MCP) and Clandestine Communist Organisation (CCO) finally gave up their armed struggle in 1989 and 1990, PFF was reorganised as the General Operations Force (GOF) in 1997. The GOF has 19 battalions and the 19th Special Battalion is tasked to provide VIP security.

When established in 1948, the PFF had 19 battalions of which two were made up of indigenous people. These battalions were known as Senoi Praaq Battalions. One battalion was a Special Security Battalion.

The 19 battalions are organised into five brigades, each headed by a Superintendent of Police. The North Brigade and Sabah Brigade have four battalions each, the Central Brigade has five battalions, and South-East Brigade and Sarawak Brigade have three battalions each.

It all began in the year 1948, when several communist activists killed three European farmers in Perak, in response to the massacre of unarmed labour activists by the British colonial occupation. Sir Edward Gent declared an emergency on 7 July 1948 in all Malaya Federations, starting with Perak on 16 June 1948 and Johor on 19 June 1948. To deal with the rebellion and to quash the Communist guerrillas in the jungle, a military based team was formed in 1948. It was named the Flying Squad and later renamed the Jungle Squad, with its main mission to fight against the Communists. The first Jungle Squad unit was established at Sik, Kedah in 1949. Training centres were opened in Sungai Buluh, Selangor and in Dusun Tua, Hulu Langat, Selangor which was known as Field Force Special Training Centre (SLPPH). In 1964, SLPPH was transferred to Kroh, Perak then changed to Kentonmen, Ulu Kinta, Perak. After being renamed the General Operations Force or Pasukan Gerakan Am in 1997, SLPPH is now known as Sekolah Latihan Pasukan Gerakan Am (General Operations Force Training Centre, SLPGA).

So far, there are two Senoi Praaq battalions specialising in search and rescue operations. After VAT 69 was absorbed into Pasukan Gerakan Khas, along with anti-terrorist police force and Special Action Unit (UTK – Unit Tindakan Khas), a special platoon of PGA, Tiger Platoon was established.

Police Counter–Terrorism Units

When the threat of terrorism started to increase after the 11 September terrorist attack in United States, followed up by a series of bombings in Bali and Jakarta, Indonesia and in Malaysia, the RMP has formed 2 anti-terrorism corps. These two elite forces are known as Pasukan Gerakan Khas (PGK) and Unit Gempur Marin (UNGERIN).

Pasukan Gerakan Khas

Pasukan Gerakan Khas is a major elite force in the Royal Malaysia Police, which is composed of 69 Commando (VAT 69) and Special Actions Unit (UTK).

This team was first merged in 1997 and became known as the Maroon Berets. However, this integration did not last and in 2003 it was separated. The VAT 69 changed to the Sandy Brown Berets, honoured by British 22nd Special Air Service (SAS). However, both units serve under the Pasukan Gerakan Khas and are under the command of a Senior Assistant Commissioner II.

This special counter-terrorism police team is also involved in some operations within Malaysia, including military operations with Malaysian Army 22nd Commando Regiment Grup Gerak Khas against the Al-Ma'unah organisation formed in Bukit Jenalik, Sauk, Perak. This team also served under the United Nations in Timor Leste and in the search and rescue operation of 700 officers and members of Indonesian National Police BRIMOB (Brigade Mobil) that were lost and trapped during the tsunami incident in Aceh, Indonesia at the end of 2005. This team also cooperated with Criminal Investigation Division to fight against dangerous crimes, such as when the PGK successfully tracked down the notorious 'Gang M16' which comprised several ethnic Chinese criminals, including the group leader who was an ex-serviceman of Singapore, and the leader Gang 13 (Mat Komando), as well as other operations. The motto of VAT 69 is WARISAN DARAH PERWIRA (Literal meaning: INHERITANCE OF THE BLOOD OF WARRIORS), while for the UTK it is TANGKAS BANTERAS GANAS (Literal meaning: QUICK TO OVERCOME TERROR).

UNGERIN

Unit Gempur Marin (UNGERIN) (Marine Combat Unit) was established in 2006 and it was fully operational by the end of 2007 with the first name as the Unit Selam Tempur due to the pressing need to suppress the pirate attacks alongside the coastal area of Malacca Straits and open sea area of South China Sea which were continuously widespread from time to time despite various efforts done to overcome the problem. The members received special training from the United States after realising the need to form a special unit to secure the national waters and river fronts from any untoward incidents. This unit is placed under formation Marine Police Branch which is based in the Marine Police Base at Kampung Aceh, Sitiawan, Perak and Lahad Datu, Sabah. It has a big role in handling threats from pirates, robbery, kidnapping and hijacking of ships and terrorist attacks in national waters. The 30 members of UNGERIN are trained by instructors from US Navy SEALs and US Coast Guard in Langkawi and Kota Kinabalu and are armed with special weaponry, such as Glock 19, MP5 and Colt M4A1 (possibly supported by the United States) and utilise maritime anti-terrorist tactics employed by the units of United States Navy commandos. For the unit's restructuring, the name of UST was changed to Unit Gempur Marin or UNGERIN in the year 2008. Its eventual goal is to have 200 operators on standby with UNGERIN.

In the first phase, the 30-personnel strong candidates is to undergo training in Langkawi and Kota Kinabalu, by instructors from Navy SEALs. Besides the basic diving training, they will be trained with other basic training, including tactical warfare, marksmanship, sniping, bomb disposal, direct action, sabotage, counter-terrorism, and intelligence gathering and paramedic training, along with special missions which are normally handled by special forces.

Federal Reserve Unit

The Federal Reserve Unit is better known with the abbreviation FRU. Their role is riot suppression, crowd control, disaster relief and rescue, as well as special operations assistance. Established on 5 December 1955, it consisted of only 3 troops then. The FRU played a role in resolving some high-profile riots, including the racial riots of 13 May 1969 and in the combined operations to catch Ibrahim Libya in the Memali Incident of Baling, Kedah which ended with 16 deaths including Ibrahim and 3 police officers.

The FRU is directly under the Inspector-General of Police. This unit is independent and is able to be rapidly deployed.

As the premiere public order unit of the RMP, the FRU is designed, equipped and specially trained for duties in suppressing and dismissing riots and illegal assemblies. Aside from the stated roles above, the unit is also tasked with the following functions:

 Public Control – during mass public assembly, such as VIPs visitors, sports event, mass rallies and processions,
 To deal with pre and post “Chemical, Biological, Radiological And Nuclear" threats,
 Disaster Rescue assistance including floods, fires, train derailments, landslides, aircraft crashes, etc.; to rescue, prevent theft, and area inclusion involved,
 Crime prevention in helping a District Police Chief in the area which particular experience sharp rise frequent a crime rate or crime happened, to certain term,
 Massive operation, such as encircle and find, heat and arrested on extremist groups or gangster elements, intensive patrol and Curfew enforcement.

The FRU is led by a Commander, and assisted by a Deputy Commander. They report to the Director of Public Order. They are aided by a few Staff Officers and known as Commanding Headquarters. FRU each in led by one Commanding Officer. Every FRU troops in led by one Troop Officer. FRU training centre presided by a Commandant. Per unit and FRU training centre has a membership to aid the administration and known as group headquarters unit.

FRU was awarded a pennant flags in year 1971 and further replaced in year 1997. These pennants are given by King of Malaysia as an appreciate charity service and FRU service during a unit establishment for maintain a national public order. During official ceremonies where the FRU affect as a parent body or detachment; such as Guard of Honour, Mess Night of FRU or Parade in conjunction with Police Anniversaries and FRU Anniversaries, FRU banner may be issued and am being marched by directing and IGP approval, Internal Security and Public Order Director or FRU Commander.

C4-i Implementations System

C4-i Implementation System (abbreviation for Command, Control, Communications, Computer-Integrated) unit is based at Police Control Centre in all police contingents in Malaysia. This unit is assigned to patrol the city and the suburbs. This unit was first established in Bukit Aman and Kuala Lumpur is the first contingent to implement this system. This unit is equipped with the CCTV system which is installed in different parts of the city and monitored by the Contingent Control Centre and each patrol car is also equipped with C4-i's system connected to a laptop. The C-4i also plays a role in forming Rakan Cops in 2006 to foster closer ties with the civilian community. Since then, the crime rates in major towns have decreased and brought about good reviews on the C4-i's and Rakan Cops implementation.

Traffic Branch

Problems in Malaysia began in the late 1920s when motorised vehicles began to hover on the road that used to be covered only by bicycle, tricycle, rickshaw and bullock carts. This situation creates a new task for the police forces, which is to maintain and control the traffic. In 1928 and 1929, the traffic branch was established in big cities, which is Kuala Lumpur, Ipoh and Seremban. Singapore, which at that time was part of Strait States have set up traffic branch earlier, which is in 1918. In other cities, the task of controlling the traffic falls on regular general duty policemen.

Because of the increasingly serious traffic problems due to the addition of vehicles, the traffic branch was set up in each state and other big cities gradually. In 1976, the central traffic branch was set up at the Bukit Aman. It is responsible for reviewing, designing and conducting research on traffic branch enforcement, training, engineering, records management and traffic law. In 2016, Traffic Branch was officially independent from Internal Security and Public Order Department.

Mounted Police Unit

Mounted Police Unit was formed in 1882 by Captain R.S.F Walker when he was appointed as Deputy Commissioner of Perak Police. At the beginning of its formation, this unit has been given the responsibility to eliminate the rampant robbers in Segenting Kamunting, Perak. In 1915, this unit expanded its role as a Personal Guard to DYMM Sultan of Perak. Members of the Mounted Police Unit at that time consisted of those seconded from the Malay States Guides Force.

Malaysian Control Centre

Marine Operations Force

Its responsibility was to maintain security at the parts in Penang and the Straits of Johor. On 6 February 2009, the name of Malaysian Marine Police was changed and known as Pasukan Gerakan Marin (English: Marine Operations Force). The rename of the organisation was launched by the Minister of Home Affair, Dato' Seri Syed Hamid Albar at PULAMAR (Abbreviation of Pusat Latihan Marin or Marine Police Training Centre), Tampoi, Johor Bahru and witness by Tan Sri Musa Hassan, the Inspector General of Police and all senior police officers and the media.

It operates from five regional bases around the peninsula and East Malaysia. Each of these regional bases are organised similarly to the Neighbourhood Police Centres of the land divisions, and conduct patrols within their maritime sectors. The PGM conducts round-the-clock patrols in Malaysian territorial waters from its five regional bases, in an area of more than 142, 393 km2 and 450, 233 km2 for EEZ as well as 4490 km for the coastlines. It is also responsible for maintaining law and order on most of Malaysia's islands. The PGM use 15 PZ class patrol boats, 33 PX class, 68 PA/PT/PC/PLC and 4 PSC/PGR/PAR class patrol boats. The branch have five main bases, 11 small bases and 24 forward bases.

Air Operations Force (Formerly Air Wing Unit)

Royal Malaysia Police Air Operations Force or Pasukan Gerakan Udara (PGU) is a special aviation unit of Royal Malaysia Police. It has a vital role in maintaining national security with thorough surveillance and patrol from the air. Established on 1 February 1979. The commander of the unit was known as Air Wing Chief initially. Started police operations with 4 Cessna CU 206G officially on 7 April 1980 with operations focused in Peninsula of Malaysia. Now, PGU owns 10 helicopters AS355 F2 and N series, 6 CE 208 Caravan, 5 Pilatus PC-6 Porter, 4 Cessna 172Sp, and 5 Beechcraft KingAir 350 (KingAir 350 is an advanced aircraft with latest Proline-21 avionics system). Police Air Unit has 4 bases in Sultan Abdul Aziz Shah Airport (Subang Airport), PLUUP (Ipoh Airport), Sarawak Base (Kuching International Airport) and Sabah Base (Kota Kinabalu International Airport).

Commercial Crime Investigation Department
This department's main function is to investigate, arrest, and prosecute offenders committing white-collar crimes such as fraud, breach of trust, cyber-crimes, forgery, counterfeiting etc. The department was divided several branches:

Forensic Investigation Accounting.
Financial Investigations.
Corporate Investigation.
Investigation of Other Counterfeiting.
Cyber & Multimedia Crime Investigation.
Operations/Technical Assistance.
International Administration/Cooperation.
Research/Intelligence.
Inspectorate.
Legislation.
Secretariat Division

The Commercial Crime Investigation Department is headed by a Director Commissioner of Police (CP) and assisted by two Deputy Directors namely Deputy Director I (Investigation) and Deputy Director II (Administration)..

Narcotics Crime Investigation Department 

This department's function is to fight against dangerous drugs by enforcing the law to stop and reduce the demand and supply of dangerous drugs.

Functions
 Enforce against drug abuse and drug trafficking
 Collect, study, assess and spread drug-related information
 Investigate distributors activities and drug trafficking syndicates
 Fight drug smuggling activities including chemicals used to process drugs
 Implement prevention of drug abuse programs
 Exchange data/information with domestic and international agencies
 Keep records and statistics related to drug distribution and other drug-related matters
 Surveillance activity for former drug offenders or members formerly associated with drug trafficking syndicates
 Provide training locally/overseas for officers / members of narcotics department
 Attend the meetings, seminars related to drugs, locally/overseas

Branches
 Special Investigation Divisions
 Coordinator Part / International-relations
 Administrative Divisions
 Detention Divisions
 Estate Stripping
 Interrogate
 Expert / Technical Assistance
 Record / Statistics
 Registration
 Logistics Divisions
 Airport Customs Staff

Narcotics Crime Investigation Division is headed by a Director with the rank of Commissioner of Police (CP) and assisted by two Deputy Directors namely Deputy Director (Enforcement / Prevention / General Policing) and Deputy Director (Property Forfeiture / Legal / Detention).

Logistics and Technology Department
The Logistics and Technology Department provides equipment needed in the RMP.

Functions
 Operate operating budget and RMP's development
 Plan, manage, operate and maintain communications, information technology, transport and weaponry
 Manage projects and maintain buildings and properties
 Manage turnover and supply of general equipment
 Manage RMP's assets

Branches
 Naziran's Branch / Administration
 Communications Branch
 Information Technology Branch
 Transport Branch
 Finance Branch
 Technical Turnover
 Weaponry Branch
 General Turnover
 Part of the Building
 Disposal / Stock / Verification / Write-off

The Logistics and Technology Department is headed by a Director with the rank of Commissioner of Police (CP) and assisted by three Deputy Directors, namely Deputy Director I (Transportation / Information Technology / Communication / Development / Maintenance), Deputy Director II (Finance / Asset Management / General Policing) and Deputy Director III (Procurement / Police Supply Center / Armament).

Integrity and Standards Compliance Department
The Integrity and Standards Compliance Department was officially established by the Inspector General of Police on 25 July 2014 and as the 9th department within the RMP. The department is headed by a Director with the rank of Commissioner of Police and assisted by two Deputy Directors, namely the Deputy Director (Integrity) and the Deputy Director (Standard Compliance).

Branches
 Manage Administration / General Policing
 Religion and Counseling Division
 Complaint Management
 Compliance
 Operational Intelligence
 Investigations / Legislation / Case Studies

Crime Prevention and Community Safety Department
The Crime Prevention and Community Safety Department was established on 9 June 2014 headed by a Director with the rank of Commissioner of Police and assisted by two Deputy Directors namely the Deputy Director (Strategic Planning) and the Deputy Director (Operations).

Sections of CPCSD
CPCSD is divided into five (5) divisions where each division is headed by a Principal Assistant Director (KPP) with the rank of SAC and a Secretary with the rank of ACP with the following responsibilities:

1. Policy / Resource Management Division
 Administration
 Employment
 Financial
 Logistics Support
 Exercise

2. Ground Operations Division
 Mobile Patrol Vehicle (MPV)
 Motorcycle Patrol Unit (URB)
 Patrol Bits
 E-Sector
3. Support Resource Coordination Division
 Auxiliary Police (PB)
 Police Volunteer Reserve (SSP)
 Suksis
 Police Cadet Corps

4. Community Policing Division
 Integrated Collaboration
 Community Policing
 Association / School Coordination
 Business Community
 Rakan Cop

5. Data Collection / Analysis Section
 Crime Data Analysis
 Data collection
 Safe City Monitoring System (SPBS)

6. JPJKK Secretariat

Traffic Enforcement and Investigation Department
Traffic Investigation and Enforcement Department was officially established on 25 March 2016 in conjunction with the 209th Police Day Celebration by the then Prime Minister Dato' Seri Najib Razak announced that the Traffic Branch will be separated from the Internal Security and Public Order Department into a new department, the "Traffic Investigation and Enforcement Department". He also personally presided over the inauguration ceremony. 

Six Principal Assistant Directors (KPP) with the rank of SAC namely, KPP General Police, KPP Enforcement, KPP Investigation/ Legislation, KPP Summons Management, KPP Secretariat/ Traffic Control and KPP Procurement/ Development/ Finance.

This department's main function is leading traffic management department with the following main service core:-

Investigation and Legislation
Enforcement
Traffic Control
Summons Management

The Traffic Investigation and Enforcement Department is headed by a Commissioner of Police (CP) and assisted by two Deputy Directors namely Deputy Director (General Policing/ Investigations/ Resources) and Deputy Director (Enforcement/ Traffic Control/ Summons Management).

Complaints Commission
Non-governmental organisations continued to press the government to create an Independent Police Complaints and Misconduct Commission (IPCMC). In 2005 a Royal Commission of Inquiry into the police had recommended a wide range of reforms, including the establishment of an IPCMC by May 2006. Draft legislation to establish an IPCMC remained under consideration by the Attorney General at the end of the year. A range of other reform recommendations, including repeal or review of laws allowing for detention without trial or requiring police permits for public assemblies, were not implemented.

Demographics
As of 2021, Chinese and Indian constituted around 1.9% and 3% of the 123,000 officers and personnel in the country respectively while the majority rest are populated by the Malays and other natives. Among the reasons of the low Chinese enrollment are the stigma in the community where the children that join the police forces are not considered as good children. Meanwhile, some were restricted from joining due to their inability to achieve a credit score for Bahasa Malaysia during SPM examination. Social campaign and short-term rules relaxation was thrown to encourage more enrollment from the two communities.

Police Headquarters/Formation

Police Contingent
 Bukit Aman Royal Malaysia Police Headquarter, Kuala Lumpur 
 Johor Contingent Police Headquarters, Johor 
 Kedah Contingent Police Headquarters, Kedah
 Kelantan Contingent Police Headquarters, Kelantan
 Kuala Lumpur Contingent Police Headquarters, Kuala Lumpur 
 Melaka Contingent Police Headquarters, Melaka
 Negeri Sembilan Contingent Police Headquarters, Negeri Sembilan
 Pahang Contingent Police Headquarters, Pahang
 Perak Contingent Police Headquarters, Perak
 Perlis Contingent Police Headquarters, Perlis
 Pulau Pinang Contingent Police Headquarters, Pulau Pinang
 Sabah Contingent Police Headquarters, Sabah
 Sarawak Contingent Police Headquarters, Sarawak
 Selangor Contingent Police Headquarters, Selangor
 Terengganu Contingent Police Headquarters, Terengganu

General Operation Force (GOF)
 Northern Region GOF Base
 Centre Region GOF Base
 South East Region GOF Base
 Sabah Region GOF Base
 Sarawak Region GOF Base

Special Police Force
 69 Commando Police Base
 Special Action Unit Police Base

Federal Reserve Unit (Anti Riot Police Force)
 1st Federal Reserve Unit Base
 2nd Federal Reserve Unit Base
 3rd Federal Reserve Unit Base
 4th Federal Reserve Unit Base
 5th Federal Reserve Unit Base
 6th Federal Reserve Unit Base
 7th Federal Reserve Unit Base
 Women Federal Reserve Unit Base
 Horseman Federal Reserve Unit Base

Police Volunteer Reserve

Marine Operation Force

 Northern Region Marine Police Base, Batu Uban, Pulau Pinang
 East Region Marine Police Base, Kuantan, Pahang
 Southern Region Marine Police Base, Johor Bahru, Johor
 Sabah Region Marine Police Base, Sandakan, Sabah
 Sarawak Region Marine Police Base, Kuching, Sarawak
 Putrajaya Marine Police Base, Putrajaya

Air Operation Force
 Peninsular Malaysia Region Air Police Base
 Sabah Region Air Police Base
 Sarawak Region Air Police Base

Police uniform and equipment

Prior to 1994, police officer was worn light blue uniform and worn along khaki/brown pants. On 17 January 1994, the new police uniform was introduced, dark navy blue long/short sleeve shirts are worn along with dark navy blue cargo pants.

A personal name tag is worn on the right side together with the police shield above it while the word "Polis" ("police" in Malay) is emblazoned in the other side. A police service number is under the name tag and a rank insignia on the right arm.

The Sam Browne belt was replaced by the brand new ballistic nylon police duty belt equipped with a standard issue Walther P99 or Px4 Storm handgun, two extra 10 round magazines, a pair of Hiatt Speedcuffs, a T-baton, a pepper spray, an LED torch and a walkie-talkie. Sometimes they are equipped with a Heckler & Koch MP5 sub-machine-gun during special situations.

Traffic officers wears white helmet or dark navy blue cap while on duty, a white long sleeve shirt with a reflective yellow vest, black riding pants with a yellow stripe and riding boots. Their equipment is the same as constables except that they have a whistle in their left pocket.

Firearms

1M4 Carbine; replacing M16 rifles, the future standard issue rifles supplied by SME Ordnance

² Royal Malaysia Police has been acquired with new sub machine gun next generation from CZ Company from Czech Republic. The New CZ Scorpion EVO 3 A1 9mm caliber is the latest generation Scorpion Sub Machine gun as part new market from Eastern Europe and it will replace the existing MP5.

Vehicles
¹ In early June, the Royal Malaysian Police (PDRM) began taking delivery of the first of its 425 new Honda Civic 1.8 S patrol cars which are equipped with RMPNeT communication equipment, dashboard cameras and digital video recorders, in order to replace Proton Wira and Proton Waja police cars in stages and will take on patrol and enforcement duties. The force is also set to add another 850 vehicles consist of 653 Civic 1.8s sedans and 197 units of Proton X70 SUV, bringing the total replacement of the vehicles to 1,275 units to completely modernise its patrol vehicle fleet.

Controversy

Abduction of Pastor Raymond Koh and Amri Che Mat 
In 2019, a national inquiry held by the Human Rights Commission of Malaysia's (SUHAKAM) concluded that agents of the Special Branch, Bukit Aman, were responsible for the abduction of Amri Che Mat in 2016 and Raymond Koh in 2017.

Troll farm 
In 2022, the internet company Meta Platforms reported that the Royal Malaysia Police were behind a troll farm. The allegation was denied.

Major cases and incidents

Lahad Datu Standoff

Following the Sulu militants intrusion, a military standoff commenced on 11 February 2013 and ended after conflict about 24 March 2013. 235 militants, most of whom were armed, arrived by boat in Lahad Datu district from Philippines territory and occupied the village of Tanduo. They were sent by Jamalul Kiram III, a claimant to the throne of the Sultanate of Sulu. His stated goal was to assert the Philippine territorial claim to eastern Sabah as part of the North Borneo dispute. In response, Malaysian security forces surrounded the village. Attempts by the Malaysian and the Philippine governments to reach a peaceful solution with Kiram's supporters were unsuccessful and the standoff escalated into an armed conflict on 1 March 2013. At the end of the standoff, around 56 militants were killed along with six civilians and 10 Malaysian security forces (of which eight were Malaysian police members). The rest of the militants were either captured or escaped back to the Philippines.

Shooting of Aminulrasyid Amzah
A schoolboy, Aminulrasyid Amzah, was shot dead by police after allegedly trying to escape from a car accident which he was involved in. Aminulrasyid was driving his sister's car without a valid driver's licence after midnight on 3 May 2010, together with his friend, Azamuddin, who was the passenger. He had been trying to flee a number of motorcyclists who were chasing both boys after their vehicle had sideswiped a car earlier that night. After Aminulrasyid was shot, his friend Azamuddin was assaulted and beaten by the police but managed to escape. The IGP and the police have made many statements to the press saying that Aminulrasyid was trying to ram a police roadblock as well as carrying a weapon in the car. Azamuddin and Aminulrasyid's family has refuted many of the police claims. Many members of the public and the opposing politicians have criticised the police's response, alluding to the fact that the police are trying to cover up the incident and fabricate evidence. The boy's family has rejected calls for an inquest into the shooting because they did not believe they would receive a fair and transparent investigation, especially from the police. Instead, they have called on the government to establish a royal commission of inquiry to investigate Aminulrasyid's death. A special eight-member panel has been formed to scrutinise the investigation of the shooting; however, opposing politicians and the boy's family have derided the formation of the panel as a publicity stunt by the government. On 24 March 2016, the High Court in Selangor awarded more than MYR400,000 in damages to the family of the victim to alleviate their pain and suffering.

Recapture of Mas Selamat Kastari
He found a traditional kampung house on stilts in Kampung Tawakal, a tiny village with a population of less than 100. Located about 10 km away from the North-South Expressway near the Kempas exit, it is almost impossible to locate for those not familiar with the area. The Singaporean terrorist, who captured world attention when he escaped from the republic's maximum security Whitley Detention Centre in February last year, could barely put up a fight in his shorts and T-shirt when caught during a dawn raid in April. At 6 am, about 30 armed policemen surrounded the kampung house and ordered Mas Selamat to come out. Police broke through two doors and rushed in when he refused to surrender. He was arrested together with two others, Abdul Matin and Johar Hassan, by a PGK and police Special Branch officers following intelligence sharing with the police forces of Indonesia and Singapore. Police also seized documents and other paraphernalia that allegedly revealed their planned operation. This report was later confirmed by both the Singapore and Malaysian governments, with the date of capture given as 1 April 2009.

The Home Minister of Malaysia, Dato' Seri Hishammuddin Hussein, and Inspector-General of Police Tan Sri Musa Hassan at Putrajaya confirmed Mas Selamat was arrested and detained under the Internal Security Act. Hishammuddin declined to give details since the case is sensitive as it involves intelligence agencies of Singapore and Indonesia, as well as Malaysia. Musa said the arrest was made possible as police in Singapore, Indonesia and Malaysia had been sharing intelligence reports over the past year. It is learnt that Special Branch officers had been working on various leads since March and upon confirming his whereabouts planned the dawn raid that resulted in his arrest.

Arrest of Nur Misuari
Nur Misuari who is the main leader and founder of one of the breakaway faction in the Philippines was arrested on 23 November 2001 together with six of his followers in Jampiras Island off Sabah after intruding past the Malaysian border illegally. Misuari is wanted in the Philippines for leading a failed rebellion against the Philippine government, which he was later extradited to the Philippine authorities in December 2001 to face legal action in his country although Malaysia and the Philippines have no extradition treaty.

Al-Mau'nah Arms Heist
In the early morning on 2 July 2000, 21 members of the militant group visited the outpost and camp of Bn 304 Rejimen Askar Wataniah under the guise of a surprise inspection and confiscated the soldiers' weapons and carted the weapons away from the armoury. They took away a huge cache of firearms and ammunition, including 97 M16 assault rifles, four GPMGs, five grenade launchers, 9,095 rounds of 5.56 mm and 60 rounds of 40 mm ammunition. The group was later cornered in the village of Sauk, Perak and involved in a stand-off with the Malaysian Army and Royal Malaysian Police forces. The Malaysian Special Forces threw a containment cordon around Bukit Jenalik. Tpr Matthew anak Medan from 21 Commando was murdered by this militant group and was awarded Pahlawan Gagah Berani. The leader and militant group surrendered to the Malaysian Special Forces and later they were handed over to the police.

The Al-Mau'nah group later surrendered, and the leaders were brought to trial for "waging war upon the King". Mohamed Amin Mohamed Razali and his group were brought to trial for charges of "waging war against the King" and became the first group of people convicted of such charges in Malaysia. Mohamed Amin Mohamed Razali and his two lieutenants, Zahit Muslim and Jamaluddin Darus, were sentenced to death. Sixteen others were given life sentences. Police Detective Corporal Sanghadevan was murdered during the incident. Assistant Superintendent Police Abdul Razak Mohd. Yusof was awarded the Seri Pahlawan Gagah Perkasa for his role in resolving the stand-off.

Memali Incident

The Memali Incident occurred in the remote village of Memali, Baling in the state of Kedah on 19 November 1985. A task force of 200 policemen under orders from the Acting Prime Minister and Home Minister Musa Hitam, laid siege to kampung (village) houses in Memali. The houses were occupied by an Islamic sect of about 400 people led by Ibrahim Mahmud a.k.a. Ibrahim Libya.

Bukit Kepong Incident

The Bukit Kepong Incident was an armed encounter which took place on 23 February 1950 between the police and the Malayan Communists during pre-independence Malaya. This conflict took place in an area surrounding the Bukit Kepong police station in Bukit Kepong, a wooden station located on the banks of the Muar River, about 59 km from Muar town, Johor.

RMP in popular culture

Books
 Malaya's Secret Police 1945–60: The Role of the Special Branch in the Malayan Emergency, 2008—the history of Malaysian Special Branch, written by former Special Branch officer, and a widely acknowledged expert on counter-insurgency, Leon Comber.
 The Struggle For Malaysian Independence, 2007—the history of Malaysian police force, written by former senior police officer, Dato' Seri J.J. Raj.
 Polis Wanita Sejarah Bergambar 1955–2007, 2007 – the history of Malaysian policewomen, written by Chief Inspector Selamat Bin Sainayune.
 Smashing Terrorism in the Malayan Emergency: The Vital Contribution of the Police, 2004 – Written by Brian Stewart, a former officer of Malayan Civil Service (MCS).
 Inspektor Junid Di Medan Jenayah, 1987 – detective and mystery stories, written by Jalil Abd. Rahman, produced by Fajar Bakti
 "Death Waits in the Dark" – Greenwood Press, 2001
 The Jungle Beat – Fighting Terrorists in Malaya – the history of Malayan police during fighting against communisme, written by former Federation of Malay State Police officers, Roy Follows.

Television
 Debu-Debu Kota (City Dusts) – Malay drama created and produced by Dato' Yusof Haslam
 Skuad Khas (Special Squad) – Malay drama created and produced by Dato' Yusof Haslam
 Gerak Khas – Malay drama created and produced by Dato' Yusof Haslam
 Roda-Roda Kuala Lumpur (Wheels of Kuala Lumpur) – Malay drama created and produced by Dato' Yusof Haslam
 CID 3278 – Malay drama produced by Rosyam Nor.
 Tragedi (Tragedy) – Malay drama broadcast on TV3
 VAT 69 - Warisan Darah Perwira – Malay documentary created by Jins Shamsuddin. Featured on ASTRO RIA.
 Metro Skuad – Malay drama created and produced by Dato' Yusof Haslam
 Pasukan Gerakan Marin – Marine Police Force drama starring Ashraf Muslim, Linda Hashim (S1 and S2), Sharnaaz Ahmad and Mardiana Alwi
 Kerambit – crime drama starring Eman Manan and Zul Huzaimy on TV2
 Undercover – Chinese drama featured in NTV7 starring Adrian Tan
 Strike Back: Revolution – British-American action television series starring Daniel MacPherson, Warren Brown, Alin Sumarwata and Faizal Hussein.
Gerak Khas Undercover

Films
 Bukit Kepong – Malay film starring Jins Shamsuddin
 Bayangan Maut – Malay film starring Dato' Yusof Haslam
 Police Story 3 – Hong Kong Cantonese film starring Jackie Chan
 Entrapment – Hollywood film starring Sean Connery and Catherine Zeta-Jones
Ops Landau - Malay action TV film (telemovie) starring Eman Manan,Ramasundram,Elly Mazlein and Corrie 'Adam' Lee
 Don - The Chase Begins Again – Bollywood film starring Shah Rukh Khan and Shaharudin Thamby (Malaysian actors)
 The Viral Factor – Hong Kong action thriller films stars Jay Chou and Nicholas Tse
 Polis Evo – Malay film starring Shaheizy Sam and Zizan Razak
 Kabali – Tamil film starring Rajinikanth
 J Revolusi – Malay film starring Zul Ariffin and Izara Aishah Hisham
 Iru Mugan – Tamil film starring Vikram
 KL Special Force – Malay film starring Dato Rosyam Nor and Fattah Amin
 Sindiket – Malay film starring Sharnaaz Ahmad, Daphne Iking and Dato Jalaluddin Hassan 
Polis Evo 2-Malay action film starring Shaheizy Sam and Zizan Razak
J2:Retribusi-Malay action film starring Zul Ariffin and Ashraf Sinclair

Documentaries
999 (Malaysian TV series), a spin-off of Cops, premiered in 2002.
OPS Maritim (OPS Maritime), about Marine Police operations and other matters.

Daily life
 Highway patrol

VCD/DVD
 Jungle Green Khaki Brown – A TV3 and Nickelodeon Books co-production DVD documentary chronicling exclusive and historical footage from the archives of the British Malayan Library in United Kingdom and the Filem Negara Malaysia in conjunction of the 50th Independence Day in 2007.

See also

Malaysian Armed Forces
 Malaysia Coast Guard
 Royal Malaysian Custom 
 Anti-Corruption Agency
 Elite Forces of Malaysia

References

External links

 

 
National Central Bureaus of Interpol
1807 establishments in British Malaya
Government agencies established in 1807
Ministry of Home Affairs (Malaysia)